Belisario is a surname. Notable people with the surname include:

Isaac Mendes Belisario (1795–1849), Jamaican artist of Jewish descent
John Belisario (1820–1900), Australian dental surgeon
Ronald Belisario (born 1982), Venezuelan baseball pitcher

See also
Belisario (given name)